American rock band No Doubt has released six studio albums, five compilation albums, three video albums, 22 singles, five promotional singles, and 21 music videos. The band was formed in Anaheim, California in 1986. After many line-up changes, it released its self-titled debut album in 1992, but its ska-pop sound was overshadowed by the popularity of the grunge movement. Following the self-released The Beacon Street Collection, Tragic Kingdom was released in 1995 and rode the surge of ska punk to become one of the best-selling albums, largely due to the international success of its third single "Don't Speak".

No Doubt's follow-up, Return of Saturn, was released nearly five years later and was quickly certified Platinum in the US, but failed to match the success of Tragic Kingdom. The band collaborated with many producers and other artists to record Rock Steady in under a year, mixing the band's new wave and pop sounds with ragga music. The album was a comeback for the band, selling well and yielding career-highest singles chart positions. After Rock Steady, the band released several compilations and went on hiatus. Singer Gwen Stefani released three solo albums and a Christmas album, and guitarist Tom Dumont's side project Invincible Overlord, a collaboration with Ted Matson, released The Living Album and a remix of No Doubt's "Bathwater" on its website. After reforming, No Doubt released their sixth album, Push and Shove, in 2012: two singles, "Settle Down" and "Looking Hot" were released from the album.

Albums

Studio albums

Compilation albums

Video albums

Singles

Promotional singles

Guest appearances

Music videos

Notes

References

See also
 Gwen Stefani discography

External links
 No Doubt's official site
 Official discography
 
 No Doubt at ASCAP
 
 

Discography
Alternative rock discographies
Discographies of American artists
Rock music group discographies
Reggae discographies